Carlo Alberto Villanueva Fuentes (born 1 July 1999) is a Chilean footballer who plays for Huachipato.

References

1999 births
Living people
Chilean footballers
Chilean Primera División players
Colo-Colo footballers
Association football midfielders